Mulchrone is a surname. Notable people with the surname include:

Charlie Mulchrone (born 1986), British rugby union player
Kathleen Mulchrone (1895–1973), Irish Celtic scholar
Vincent Mulchrone (1923–1977), British journalist